The Best of Grace Slick is a 1999 compilation album of Grace Slick's work, focusing mostly on work with Jefferson Airplane, Jefferson Starship and Starship.  There are three tracks  from her solo albums, although none appear from Dreams (1980).

The album includes a previously unreleased bonus track that was recorded during Starship's Knee Deep in the Hoopla sessions called "Do You Remember Me?".

Track listing

Grace Slick albums
1999 compilation albums
RCA Records compilation albums